Charles Powell Leslie (III) (13 September 1821 – 26 June 1871) was a Conservative member of the UK Parliament for Monaghan (1843–1871) and Lord Lieutenant of Monaghan (1858–1871). He was the third of his name; his father, and grandfather, also represented Monaghan.

Leslie was educated at Christ Church, Oxford, where he matriculated in 1839. He played one first class cricket match for Oxford University Cricket Club against Marylebone Cricket Club at Lord's on 16–17 March 1841.

He was unmarried, died without issue, and was succeeded as MP by his younger brother Sir John Leslie, 1st Baronet.

References

1821 births
1871 deaths
Members of the Parliament of the United Kingdom for County Monaghan constituencies (1801–1922)
UK MPs 1841–1847
UK MPs 1847–1852
UK MPs 1852–1857
UK MPs 1857–1859
UK MPs 1859–1865
UK MPs 1865–1868
UK MPs 1868–1874
Oxford University cricketers
Alumni of Christ Church, Oxford
Irish Conservative Party MPs